The 2013–14 GET-ligaen is the 75th and current season of Norway's premier ice hockey league, Eliteserien (known as GET-ligaen for sponsorship reasons).

The regular season began play on September 14, 2013 and concluded on March 4, 2014, with Vålerenga claiming the League Championship in the last match, defeating Stavanger Oilers 7–1.

The playoffs to determine the 2014 Norwegian Ice Hockey Champions began on March 7, and ended on April 14, 2014. When Kurt Davis AKA The Alabamma Slamma went Tommy Noble on the Stavanger Oilers, and defeated Vålerenga Ishockey by 4 games to 2 in the Final to win their fourth title.

Participating teams

Regular season

Standings
Updated as of March 4, 2014.
x – clinched playoff spot; y – clinched regular season league title; r – play in relegation series

1 Lørenskog were deducted 20 point
2 Storhamar were deducted 15 point because of for lack of financial control

Source: pointstreak.com

Statistics

Scoring leaders
 
List shows the ten best skaters based on the number of points during the regular season. If two or more skaters are tied (i.e. same number of points, goals and played games), all of the tied skaters are shown. Updated as of November 30, 2013.
GP = Games played; G = Goals; A = Assists; Pts = Points; +/– = Plus/minus; PIM = Penalty minutes

Source: pointstreak.com

Leading goaltenders
The top five goaltenders based on goals against average.

Source: pointstreak.com

Attendance

Source:pointstreak.com

Playoffs
After the regular season, the top eight teams will be qualified for the playoffs. In the first and second rounds, the highest remaining seed chooses which of the two lowest remaining seeds to be matched against. In each round the higher-seeded team is awarded home ice advantage. Each best-of-seven series follows a 1–1–1–1–1–1–1 format: the higher-seeded team plays at home for games 1 and 3 (plus 5 and 7 if necessary), and the lower-seeded team at home for games 2, 4 and 6 (if necessary).

Bracket
Updated as of April 14, 2014.

Source: pointstreak.com

Statistics

Scoring leaders
 
List shows the ten best skaters based on the number of points during the playoffs. If two or more skaters are tied (i.e. same number of points, goals and played games), all of the tied skaters are shown. Updated as of April 14, 2014.
GP = Games played; G = Goals; A = Assists; Pts = Points; +/– = Plus/minus; PIM = Penalty minutes

Source: pointstreak.com

Leading goaltenders
The top five goaltenders based on goals against average.

Source: pointstreak.com

Attendance

Source:pointstreak.com

Qualification
After the regular season had ended, the two lowest ranked teams in the league and the two highest ranked teams in the 1. divisjon competed for the right to play in the 2014–15 GET-ligaen. Kongsvinger Knights, Manglerud Star, Stjernen Hockey and the Tønsberg Vikings took part. The tournament was organized according to a double round robin format, where each club played the others twice, home and away, for a total of six games. The points system and ranking method used, was the same as in the GET-ligaen.

Standings
Updated as of March 27, 2014.

q – qualified for next years GET-league; r – will play in next years 1. division

GP = Games played; W = Wins; L = Losses; OTW = Overtime Wins; OTL = Overtime losses; SOW = Shootout Wins; SOL = Shootout losses; GF = Goals for; GA = Goals against; Pts = Points
Source: speaker.no

Awards
All-Star team

The following players were selected to the 2013–14 GET-ligaen All-Star team:
Goaltender: Brady Hjelle (Rosenborg)
Defenseman: Mats Trygg (Vålerenga)
Defenseman: Kurt Davis (Stavanger)
Center: Jeff LoVecchio (Lillehammer)
Winger: Sondre Olden (Vålerenga)
Winger: Jonas Johansson (Frisk Asker)

Other
Coach of the year: Espen Knutsen (Vålerenga)

References

External links
  

2013-14
Nor
GET-ligaen